The Wapello Community School District, or Wapello Community Schools,  is a rural public school district headquartered in Wapello, Iowa.  It is mostly within Louisa County, with a smaller area in Des Moines County, and serves the towns of Wapello and Oakville, and the surrounding rural areas.

In 2015, the district entered an agreement with the Morning Sun Community School District to share the services of superintendent Mike Peterson.

Schools
The district operates three schools, all in Wapello:
 Wapello Elementary School
 Wapello Junior High School
 Wapello High School

Wapello High School

Athletics
The Indians compete in the Southeast Iowa Superconference in the following sports:
Cross Country
Volleyball
Football
Wrestling
 1992 Class 2A State Champions 
Basketball
Track and Field
Golf
 Boys' 2-time Class 2A State Champions (1993, 2000)
Soccer
Baseball
Softball

Enrollment

See also
List of school districts in Iowa
List of high schools in Iowa

References

External links
 Wapello Community School District

School districts in Iowa
Education in Louisa County, Iowa
Education in Des Moines County, Iowa